Cheryomushki District (derived from "", meaning "bird cherry tree"), formerly Brezhnevsky District, is a district of South-Western Administrative Okrug of the federal city of Moscow, Russia. Population:  

The district is delimited by Nakhimovsky Avenue (north), Obrucheva Street (south), Sevastopolsky Avenue (east), Profsoyuznaya Street, and Vlasova Street (west). The district is mostly residential, with an industrial area near Kaluzhskaya metro station. It houses the old Gazprom headquarters.

History
In 1956, the northern side of the district became a site of a massive, cheap housing construction (known as Khrushchyovka) and a microdistrict was built there. Cheryomushki became a common word for such housing projects.  The Soviet-era buildings in this area were torn down in the 1990s-2000s and replaced with high-rises, also of standardized prefabricated concrete.

Following the death of leader Leonid Brezhnev, the district was renamed Brezhnevsky District in his honour.  In 1989 the name was changed back to Cheryomushki.

In the early 1980s, the government built a number of better quality, brickwork apartment buildings that acquired a reputation of, by local standards, elite housing, and called Tsarskoye Selo (Royal village). In the 1990s, it served as a nucleus of a massive new housing construction project between Garibaldi Street and Gazprom tower.

Politics
The head of the local government, Sergey Burkotov, was shot dead in February 2007, in what appears to have been an assassination.

Public transportation
The western side of the district is accessible by the Kaluzhsko-Rizhskaya Line of the Moscow Metro (stations Profsoyuznaya to Kaluzhskaya). The eastern side is also accessible through the Serpukhovsko-Timiryazevskaya Line (Sevastopolskaya, Nakhimovsky Prospekt).

Economy
Gazprom has its head office in the district. The airline Aero Rent has its head office in the district.

In popular culture
The Cheryomushki district was immortalized by Shostakovich in his immensely popular operetta Moscow, Cheryomushki.  In the operetta, the cheap housing in the district is portrayed ironically as a 'dream come true' for Muscovites who had lost their houses in other, more traditional, parts of Moscow.  The operetta satirizes the corruption and bureaucracy of the Soviet state through hilariously observed caricatures.

Cheryomushki is also prominently mentioned in the popular film The Irony of Fate, which is traditionally shown on New Year's Eve in Russia and other states of the former USSR. The key subplot of the film is the drab uniformity of Brezhnev era public architecture.

References

External links
Official website of Cheryomushki District 

Districts of Moscow
South-Western Administrative Okrug